Cayli may refer to:
 Çaylı (disambiguation), places in Azerbaijan
 Cəyli, Azerbaijan